Anastasiya Novikova may refer to:

Anastasiya Novikova (journalist)
Anastasiya Novikova (footballer)